The members of the National Assembly of Zambia from 1988 until 1991 were elected on 26 October 1988. The country was a one-party state at the time, meaning the only party represented was the United National Independence Party. An additional ten members were nominated by President Kenneth Kaunda.

List of members

Elected members

Non-elected members

References

1988